Amanda Araceli Pérez Murillo (born 31 July 1994) is a professional footballer who plays as a midfielder for Liga MX Femenil side Club América. Born in the United States, she represents the Mexico women's national team.

She is the younger sister of Club Tijuana (Liga MX Femenil) player Verónica Pérez, a former forward on the Mexico women's national football team and a University of Washington alumna.

Playing career

University of Washington
Perez played for the University of Washington Huskies. Having graduated from San Mateo High School in 2011, Perez delayed her college enrollment to recover from a knee injury and participate in the 2012 FIFA U-20 Women's World Cup with Mexico.

International
Perez played for Mexico at both U17 and U20 levels. She played in 2010 FIFA U-17 Women's World Cup, 2012 FIFA U-20 Women's World Cup and 2014 FIFA U-20 Women's World Cup.

She received her senior level call-up from Mexico for the 2013 Algarve Cup, joining older sister and senior veteran Veronica Perez. She appeared as a late substitute in two out of Mexico's four total matches in Portugal, including the knockout stage match.

See also
Mexico women's national football team
Washington Huskies
List of University of Washington people

References

External links
 
 Profile  at Mexican Football Federation
 

1994 births
Living people
Citizens of Mexico through descent
Mexican women's footballers
Women's association football midfielders
Mexico women's international footballers
2015 FIFA Women's World Cup players
Toppserien players
SK Brann Kvinner players
Damallsvenskan players
Vittsjö GIK players
Campeonato Nacional de Futebol Feminino players
Sporting CP (women's football) players
Mexican expatriate women's footballers
Mexican expatriate sportspeople in Norway
Expatriate women's footballers in Norway
Mexican expatriate sportspeople in Sweden
Expatriate women's footballers in Sweden
Mexican expatriate sportspeople in Portugal
Expatriate women's footballers in Portugal
American women's soccer players
Soccer players from California
Sportspeople from Hayward, California
People from San Mateo, California
American sportspeople of Mexican descent

Washington Huskies women's soccer players
American expatriate women's soccer players
American expatriate sportspeople in Norway
American expatriate sportspeople in Sweden
American expatriate sportspeople in Portugal